John W. Reid Jr. (December 26, 1879 – December 15, 1968) was a California architect who served as the San Francisco city architect from 1918-1930.

Reid was born in San Francisco. He studied architecture at the University of California, Berkeley under John Galen Howard, and then continued at the École Nationale Supérieure des Beaux-Arts in Paris. Upon his return, he joined Daniel Burnham's firm, where he worked as a draftsman for architect Willis Polk. In 1911 he established his own office, which designed a number of city buildings. He served as city architect during the tenure of mayor (later governor) James Rolph Jr., who was married to Reid's sister. As city architect, he drew up designs for buildings as directed by the board of public works, and supervised their construction, for which he was paid a fee of 6% of the total construction cost. Reid was a consulting architect for the San Francisco Civic Center, including the San Francisco City Hall, and best known for his designs of city schools and libraries, the San Francisco Fire Chief's House, and the Union Iron Works Turbine Machine Shop.

References 
 Pacific Coast Architecture Database
 "The Work of John Reid, Jr.", Architect and Engineer, volume 60, 02/1920, pages 43–85.
 Phi Delta Theta Chapter House, Alameda County, California, Margaret Brentano, Berkeley Architectural Heritage Association, 1981, nomination document, National Park Service, National Register of Historic Places, Washington, D.C.
 California Appellate Decisions, Volume 29, California District Courts of Appeal, pages 672-675.
 Berkeley Heritage: Phi Delta Theta
 Living Places
 Noe Hill Architects

1879 births
1968 deaths
Architects from San Francisco
20th-century American architects
University of California, Berkeley alumni